The 2018 Anchorage mayoral election was held on April 3, 2018, to elect the mayor of Anchorage, Alaska. It saw reelection of incumbent mayor Ethan Berkowitz.

Since Berkowitz obtained 55% in the initial round, more than the 45% plurality required, no runoff was necessitated.

Results

References

See also

2018 United States mayoral elections
2018 Alaska elections 
2018